Dmitri Vitalyevich Veber (born 10 February 1999) is a Russian football player.

Club career
He made his debut in the Russian Professional Football League for FC SKA Rostov-on-Don on 22 August 2015 in a game against FC Druzhba Maykop.

Veber played his first match in the Russian Premier League for FC Rostov on 9 September 2016 in a game against FC Krylia Sovetov Samara.

References

External links
 
 Profile by Russian Professional Football League

1999 births
Sportspeople from Rostov-on-Don
Living people
Russian footballers
Russia youth international footballers
Association football midfielders
FC SKA Rostov-on-Don players
FC Rostov players
FC TSK Simferopol players
Russian Premier League players
Crimean Premier League players
FC Veles Moscow players